Pope John XI of Alexandria, 89th Pope of Alexandria and Patriarch of the See of St. Mark.

Before his enthronement as Pope, his name was Farag. After his enthronement, he became known as John El-Maksi because he was from El-Maksa district in Cairo.

He was contemporary to Al-Ashraf Sayf-ad-Din Barsbay, Al-Aziz Jamal-ad-Din Yusuf, Az-Zahir Sayf-ad-Din Jaqmaq, and Al-Mansur Fakhr-ad-Din Uthman, the Burji sultans of Egypt. During his Papacy, the Copts encountered many hardships that the kings of Ethiopia threatened the Burji Mamluks to cut the flow of the Nile because of their persecution of the Christians. John XI was forbidden to communicate with the kings of Ethiopia and Nubia without the permission and knowledge of the sultans.

John XI was enthroned on 16 Pashons, 1143 A.M. (May 11, 1427 A.D.). He occupied the Throne of Saint Mark for 24 years, 11 months, and 23 days. He departed on 9 Pashons, 1168 A.M. (May 4, 1452). He was buried in the tomb of the Monastery of El-Khandak. The Papal Throne remained vacant after his departure for 4 months and 6 days.

15th-century Coptic Orthodox popes of Alexandria
1452 deaths